The Whim was a play written and published by Eglantine Wallace in 1795. Despite its completion, the play was never performed as it was banned under the Licensing Act 1737. The play received considerable backlash from Wallace for its 
scrutiny towards her work and the subsequent removal of it from theatrical production.

Overview

The Whim is set in 18th century English society under the estate of Lord Crotchett--a wealthy noble who has decided to entertain the idea of hosting an ancient event known as the Feast of Saturnalia. The feast challenged the social structure of 18th century England at the time by inverting the roles of nobility and the servant class. This may have likely been the reason for the play's ban, preventing it from being performed in theaters after 1795 under the Licensing Act of 1737.

While Lord Crotchett's role as master to the estate was changed to a servant, Nell and Fag (two of the former servants) are put in charge of the estate for the day due to their low social class standing. The play follows the drama and events which Nell and Fag take part in, ultimately culminating in the marriage between Maria (a head maid) and Caesar (a disguised noble not originally from the estate). While Lord Crotchett does not consent to the marriage initially, he permits it and even condones it as he does not have the power to deny Fag or Nell in this social structure.

Criticism and interpretation

Wallace's public image was apparently well received in London on her return in 1793 while she was entertaining General Charles François Dumouriez. However, her distaste for English government surfaced in The Whim in both the preface and the general themes of the play. Due to the Licensing Act of 1737 being in effect, Wallace's play was silenced before it could be publicly performed, leaving it to manuscript formats only. 

Many theater historians have argued that the censorship of Wallace's The Whim only further highlighted the impact of the Licensing Act of 1737 which was still in effect at the time. Historians also argue that the censoring of this play only demonstrated the overpowering nature of the Examiner of Plays and how it impacted British theater during the late 18th century, effectively sterilizing theaters of any non-favorable political themes or alignments.

References

Further reading

 The Licensing Act of 1737 (the text of the act)

1795 plays
Censorship in the United Kingdom
English-language plays